Sarea is a genus of small, non-lichenized, inoperculate discomycete fungi in the family Zythiaceae. Sarea species are found growing on the resin of conifers in the Cupressaceae and Pinaceae in the northern hemisphere. The genus contains two easily distinguishable species: apothecia of Sarea difformis are black, while those of Sarea resinae are orange in color.

Species
 Sarea difformis
 Sarea resinae

References

External links
Index Fungorum
Mycobank
iNaturalist

Taxa named by Elias Magnus Fries